Gudalur may refer to:

Towns in Tamil Nadu
 Gudalur (Coimbatore district)
 Gudalur, Nilgiris
 Gudalur, Theni

Other uses
 Gudalur (State Assembly Constituency), constituency in Nilgiris district.
 Gudalur taluk
 Gudalur Janmam Abolition Act
 Gudalur division
 Gudalur block